Moulton Football Club is a football club based in Moulton, England. They are currently members of the Spartan South Midlands League Division One and play at Brunting Road, Moulton.

History
Moulton were formed in 1896, playing their first game against the village of Old, resulting in a 2–2 draw. In 2004, the club won the Northamptonshire Combination Premier Division, finishing runners up in 2005 and 2006. In 2022, the club was admitted into the Spartan South Midlands League Division One.

Ground
The club currently play at Brunting Road, Moulton. In 2018, a 3G pitch was installed at the ground.

References

Association football clubs established in 1896
1896 establishments in England
Football clubs in England
Football clubs in Northamptonshire
Northamptonshire Combination Football League
Spartan South Midlands Football League